The following topics relate to Shabbat:

Sabbaths
 Shabbat, Judaism's day of rest
 Motza'ei Shabbat, the night after Shabbat
 Special Shabbat, a day with special significance, including Shabbat Shuvah, Shirah, Shekalim, Zachor, Parah, HaChodesh, HaGadol, Chazon, Nachamu, Mevarchim, Chol HaMoed, Chol Hamoed Pesach, and Chol Hamoed Sukkot
 Ten Days of Repentance, including Shabbat Shuvah
 The Nine Days, including Shabbat Chazon
 Chol HaMoed, including Shabbat Chol HaMoed, Chol Hamoed Pesach, and Chol Hamoed Sukkot
 Shabbaton (Sabbatical), extra-celebratory Shabbat
 Shmita (Sabbatical year)
 Jubilee (biblical)

Shabbat law
 
 Activities prohibited on Shabbat
 Rabbinically prohibited activities of Shabbat
 Conservative halakha
 Driving on Shabbat
 Electricity on Shabbat
 Eruv, a boundary used on Shabbat
 Eve of Passover on Shabbat
 Sabbath desecration

Shabbat technology
:Category:Shabbat innovations
 Shabbat clock
 Shabbat elevator
 Shabbat lamp
 Shabbat microphone
 Sabbath mode
 Shabbat module

Shabbat observances
 Amidah
 Havdalah, Shabbat closing service observed at Motzei Shabbat
 Jewish prayer services on Shabbat
 Maariv, Shabbat evening prayer
 Pesukei dezimra
 Shabbat candles, lit on Preparation Day evening prior to sunset
 Shalom, a Hebrew greeting on Shabbat
 Torah reading
 Weekly Torah portion
 :Category:Weekly Torah readings
 Yotzer ohr
 Zemirot, Shabbat songs

Shabbat food
 Shabbat meals
 Seudah Shlishit, third Shabbat meal
 
 Cholent
 Jewish cuisine
 Cuisine of the Mizrahi Jews
 Cuisine of the Sephardic Jews
 Kiddush, Shabbat blessing over wine
 Manna
 Sabbath food preparation

Shabbat people
 Shabbos goy, non-Jew who performs activities permitted to him on the Jewish Shabbat
 Shabtai (given name)
 Shomer Shabbat, Shabbat-observant Jew
 Sons of Zadok

Shabbat history
 Black Shabbat or Operation Agatha, a British police operation beginning Shabbat, June 29, 1946
 Kikar HaShabbat, an intersection in Jerusalem noted for Shabbat demonstrations
 Oyneg Shabbos, a Jewish ghetto documentary group active 1939-1943

Shabbat writings
 Shabbat (Talmud), a tractate of the Talmud
 Shabbat B'Shabbato, a weekly leaflet
 Shemirat Shabbat Kehilchatah, a 20th-century work on the laws of Shabbat and Yom Tov
 Siddur, a prayerbook for daily or weekly use

Shabbat categories

General
 
 Hebrew calendar
 Jewish greetings
 Jewish holidays
 Jewish symbolism
 Judaism
 List of Jewish prayers and blessings

See also
 Biblical Sabbath
 Sabbath in Christianity
 Sabbath in seventh-day churches
 Sabbath economics, a Christian economic model
 Sabbatical
 Seven-day week
 Workweek and weekend

List
Shabbat topics